Louis Francis Kelleher (August 4, 1889 – November 26, 1946) was a Roman Catholic bishop.

Born in Cambridge, Massachusetts, Kelleher was ordained to the priesthood on April 3, 1915. On April 21, 1945, he was appointed titular bishop of Thenae,' auxiliary bishop of the Roman Catholic Archdiocese of Boston, and was ordained on June 8, 1945. He died while still in office.

Notes

1889 births
1946 deaths
People from Cambridge, Massachusetts
20th-century American Roman Catholic titular bishops
Catholics from Massachusetts
American Roman Catholic clergy of Irish descent